Gremlins is a 1984 video game developed and published by Atari, Inc. for the Atari 2600. It is a tie-in to the 1984 film Gremlins. Atari released another, substantially different game based on the film for the Atari 5200.

Gameplay 

The 2600 game consists of two playable screens and can be played by one player or two players alternating turns. The first screen is similar to the 1981 game Kaboom!. The player controls protagonist Billy Peltzer, who runs side-to-side across the screen catching falling Mogwai to prevent them from eating hamburgers. In the second screen, similar to Space Invaders, the player moves Billy back and forth across the screen and shoots waves of descending gremlins.

Development 
Gremlins, directed by Joe Dante, was the center of a major merchandising push in the months surrounding its release. Atari developed video game tie-ins for both of its contemporary consoles, the Atari 2600 and the Atari 5200. The game was also the final game released for the 5200. Atari intended to release both along with the film in 1984, but the company stopped shipment of all its games after its reorganization that year. Atari first previewed the 2600 version of the game at the 1984 Consumer Electronics Show in Chicago. It was released in limited numbers later that year, and became moderately rare.

Reception 
In retrospective reviews, Brett Weiss called it "derivative" and lacking in originality, and humorist Seanbaby criticized the premise of defending hamburgers from gremlins, calling it a "clumsily rearranged Hamburglar game".

References 

 

1984 video games
Atari 2600 games
Atari 2600-only games
Video games based on films
Video games developed in the United States
Gremlins (franchise)